The 2013 South Carolina State Bulldogs football team represented South Carolina State University in the 2013 NCAA Division I FCS football season. They were led by 12th year head coach Oliver Pough and played their home games at Oliver C. Dawson Stadium. They were a member of the Mid-Eastern Athletic Conference. They finished the season 9–4, 7–1 in MEAC play to win a share of the MEAC championship with Bethune-Cookman. Due to their loss to Bethune-Cookman, they did not receive the conference's automatic bid to the FCS Playoffs. However, they did receive an at-large bid to the FCS Playoffs where they lost in the first round to Furman.

Schedule

Source: Schedule

References

South Carolina State
South Carolina State Bulldogs football seasons
Mid-Eastern Athletic Conference football champion seasons
South Carolina State
South Carolina State Bulldogs football